South Africa is known for its ethnic and cultural diversity. Amongst black South Africans, a substantial number of rural inhabitants lead largely impoverished lives. Almost all South Africans speak English to some degree of proficiency, in addition to their native language, with English acting as a lingua franca in commerce, education, and government. South Africa has eleven official languages, but other indigenous languages are also spoken by smaller groups, chiefly Khoisan languages.

Members of the middle class, who are predominantly white and Indian but whose ranks include growing numbers of other groups, have lifestyles similar in many respects to that of people found in Western Europe, North America, Australia and New Zealand.

The Apartheid state legally classified South Africans into one of four race groups, and determined where they could live, and enforced segregation in education, work opportunities, public amenities and social relations. Although these laws were abolished by the early 1990s, the apartheid racial categories remain ingrained in South African culture, with South Africans continuing to classify themselves, and each other, as belonging to one of the four defined race groups (blacks, whites, Coloureds and Indians) making it difficult to define a single South African culture that doesn't make reference to these racial categories.

History

Art

The oldest art objects in the world were discovered in a South African cave. Dating from 75,000 years ago, these small drilled snail shells could have no other function than to have been strung on a string as a necklace. South Africa was one of the cradles of the human species. One of the defining characteristics of our species is the making of art (from Latin 'ars' meaning worked or formed from basic material).

The scattered tribes of Khoisan peoples moving into South Africa from around 10,000 BC had their own fluent art styles seen today in a multitude of cave paintings. They were superseded by Bantu and Nguni peoples with their own vocabularies of art forms. In the 20th century, traditional tribal forms of art were scattered and re-melded by the divisive policies of apartheid.

New forms of art evolved in the mines and townships: a dynamic art using everything from plastic strips to bicycle spokes. The Dutch-influenced folk art of the Afrikaner Trekboer and the urban white artists earnestly following changing European traditions from the 1850s onwards also contributed to this eclectic mix, which continues to evolve today.

One form of art developed during the period of apartheid. This new characterization was termed "township art" and became common in the 1960s and 1970s. This art style tended to depict scenes from everyday life of poor black individuals in South Africa. Common visual elements in this art style are dilapidated houses, women washing clothes, penny whistlers, and black mother-and-child tableaux.

Contemporary South Africa has a stellar art scene, with artists receiving international recognition. The recent 'Figures and Fictions' exhibition of South African photography at the Victoria and Albert Museum in London included the work of Mikhael Subotzky, Zanele Muholi, David Goldblatt, Zwelethu Mthethwa and Guy Tillim. Contemporary South African artists whose work has been met with international acclaim include Marlene Dumas and William Kentridge.

Architecture 

The architecture of South Africa mirrors the vast ethnic and cultural diversity of the country and its historical colonial period. In addition, influences from other distant countries have contributed to the variety of the South African architectural landscape.

Herbert Baker, among the country's most influential architects, designed the Union Buildings in Pretoria. Other buildings of note include the Rhodes memorial and St George's Cathedral in Cape Town, and St John's College in Johannesburg.

Cape Dutch architecture was prominent in the early days (17th century) of the Cape Colony, and the name derives from the fact that the initial settlers of the Cape were primarily Dutch. The style has roots in medieval Holland, Germany, France and Indonesia. Houses in this style have a distinctive and recognizable design, with a prominent feature being the grand, ornately rounded gables, reminiscent of features in townhouses of Amsterdam built in the Dutch style.

The rural landscape of South Africa is populated with traditional and European-influenced African architecture.

Literature 

There are 11 national languages in South Africa. South Africa's unique social and political history has generated a rich variety of literatures, with themes spanning pre-colonial life, the days of apartheid, and the lives of people in the "new South Africa".

Many of the first black South African print authors were missionary-educated, and many thus wrote in either English or Afrikaans. One of the first well known novels written by a black author in an African language was Solomon Thekiso Plaatje's Mhudi, written in 1930.

Notable white English-language South African authors include Nadine Gordimer who was, in Seamus Heaney's words, one of "the guerrillas of the imagination", and who became the first South African and the seventh woman to be awarded the Nobel Prize for Literature in 1991. Her novel, July's People, was released in 1981, depicting the collapse of white-minority rule.

Athol Fugard, whose plays have been regularly premiered in fringe theatres in South Africa, London (The Royal Court Theatre), and New York City. Olive Schreiner's The Story of an African Farm (1883) was a revelation in Victorian literature: it is heralded by many as introducing feminism into the novel form.

Alan Paton published the acclaimed novel Cry, the Beloved Country in 1948. He told the tale of a black priest who comes to Johannesburg to find his son, which became an international best-seller. During the 1950s, Drum magazine became a hotbed of political satire, fiction, and essays, giving a voice to urban black culture.

Afrikaans-language writers also began to write controversial material. Breyten Breytenbach was jailed for his involvement with the guerrilla movement against apartheid. Andre Brink was the first Afrikaner writer to be banned by the government after he released the novel A Dry White Season about a white South African who discovers the truth about a black friend who dies in police custody.

John Maxwell (JM) Coetzee was also first published in the 1970s, and became internationally recognize in 1983 with his Booker Prize-winning novel Life & Times of Michael K. His 1999 novel Disgrace won him his second Booker Prize as well as the 2000 Commonwealth Writers' Prize. He is also the recipient of the Nobel Prize for Literature in 2003.

English writer J. R. R. Tolkien, author of The Hobbit, The Lord of the Rings and The Silmarillion, was born in Bloemfontein in 1892.

Poetry

South Africa has a rich tradition of oral poetry. Several influential African poets became prominent in the 1970s such as Mongane Wally Serote, whose most famous work, No Baby Must Weep, gave insight into the everyday lives of black South Africans under apartheid. Another famous black novelist, Zakes Mda, transitioned from poetry and plays to becoming a novelist in the same time period. His novel, The Heart of Redness won the 2001 Commonwealth Writers Prize and was made a part of the school curriculum across South Africa.

Cinema 

While many foreign films have been produced about South Africa (usually involving race relations), few local productions are known outside South Africa itself. One exception was the film The Gods Must Be Crazy in 1980, set in the Kalahari. This is about how life in a traditional community of San (Bushmen) is changed when a Coke bottle, thrown out of a plane, suddenly lands from the sky. The late Jamie Uys, who wrote and directed The Gods Must Be Crazy, also had success overseas in the 1970s with his films Funny People and Funny People II, similar to the TV series Candid Camera in the US. Leon Schuster's You Must Be Joking! films are in the same genre, and hugely popular among South Africans. Schuster's most successful film internationally is Mr Bones, which was also the best performing film locally at the time of its release, grossing 35m USD. This was surpassed by the sequel, Mr Bones 2: Back from the Past.

The most high-profile film portraying South Africa in recent years was District 9. Directed by Neill Blomkamp, a native South African, and produced by Peter Jackson, the action/science-fiction film depicts a sub-class of alien refugees forced to live in the slums of Johannesburg in what many saw as a creative allegory for apartheid. The film was a critical and commercial success worldwide, and was nominated for Best Picture at the 82nd Academy Awards.

Other notable exceptions are the film Tsotsi, which won the Academy Award for Foreign Language Film at the 78th Academy Awards in 2006 as well as U-Carmen e-Khayelitsha, which won the Golden Bear at the 2005 Berlin International Film Festival.

Music 

There is great diversity in music from South Africa. Many black musicians who sang in Afrikaans or English during apartheid have since begun to sing in traditional African languages, and have developed a unique style called Kwaito. Of note is Brenda Fassie, who launched to fame with her song "Weekend Special", which was sung in English. More famous traditional musicians include Ladysmith Black Mambazo, while the Soweto String Quartet performs classic music with an African flavour. White and Coloured South African singers are historically influenced by European musical styles.

South Africa has produced world-famous jazz musicians, notably Hugh Masekela, Jonas Gwangwa, Abdullah Ibrahim, Miriam Makeba, Jonathan Butler, Chris McGregor, and Sathima Bea Benjamin. Afrikaans music covers multiple genres, such as the contemporary Steve Hofmeyr and the punk rock band Fokofpolisiekar. Crossover artists such as Verity (internationally recognised for innovation in the music industry) and Johnny Clegg and his bands Juluka and Savuka have enjoyed various success underground, publicly, and abroad. Don Clarke who wrote Sanbonani, a local hit for P J Powers and Hotline in 1986 wrote much of the music for Leon Schuster's films including Till You're Free Again which he recorded for the film Frank and Fearless in 2018. Rap-rave group Die Antwoord have also found international success.

The South African music scene includes Kwaito, a new music genre that had developed in the mid-1980s and has since developed to become a popular socio-economic form of representation among the populace. However, some argue that the political aspects of Kwaito have since diminished after Apartheid, and the relative interest in politics has become a very minor aspect of daily life. Others argue that in a sense, Kwaito is in fact a political force that shows activism in its apolitical actions.

Today, major corporations like Sony, BMG, and EMI have appeared on the South African scene to produce and distribute Kwaito music. Due to its popularity, as well as the general influence of DJs, who are among the top 5 most influential types of people within the country, Kwaito has taken over radio, television, and magazines.

South African rock music is a very popular subculture, especially within the Johannesburg region. The alternative rock and metal band Seether gained international popularity in the early 2000s, with five of their albums achieving Gold or Platinum certification in the United States. Four other alternative rock bands, KONGOS, Civil Twilight, Prime Circle and the Parlotones have also achieved success abroad in the late 2000s.

Cuisine 

The cuisine of South Africa is heavily meat-based and has spawned the distinctively South African social gathering known as a braai. A variation of the barbecue, braais often feature boerewors or spicy sausages, and mielies (maize) or Mielie-meal, often as a porridge, or pearl millet, a staple food of black South Africans. Pastries such like koeksisters and desserts like melktert (milk tart) are also universally popular.

Indian food like curry is also popular, especially in Durban with its large Indian population. Another local Indian Durban speciality is the 'bunny' or bunny chow, which consists of a hollowed-out loaf of white bread filled with curry.

The Portuguese community has also made its mark, with spicy peri-peri chicken being a favourite. The South African Portuguese-themed restaurant chain Nando's now has restaurants in the United Kingdom, United States, Canada, Australia, Ireland, New Zealand, Malaysia, Kenya and the United Arab Emirates.

Wine

South Africa has developed into a major wine producer, with some of the best vineyards lying in valleys around Stellenbosch, Franschhoek, Paarl and Barrydale. South African wine has a history dating back to 1659, and at one time Constantia was considered one of the greatest wines in the world. Access to international markets has unleashed a burst of new energy and new investment. Production is concentrated around Cape Town, with major vineyard and production centres at Paarl, Stellenbosch and Worcester.

There are about 60 appellations within the Wine of Origin (WO) system, which was implemented in 1973 with a hierarchy of designated production regions, districts and wards. WO wines must be made 100% from grapes from the designated area. "Single vineyard" wines must come from a defined area of less than 5 hectares. An "Estate Wine" can come from adjacent farms, as long as they are farmed together and wine is produced on site. A ward is an area with a distinctive soil type and/or climate, and is roughly equivalent to a European appellation.

Education 

Learners have twelve years of formal schooling, from grade 1 to 12. Grade R is a pre-primary foundation year. Primary schools span the first seven years of schooling. High School education spans a further five years. The Senior Certificate examination takes place at the end of grade 12 and is necessary for tertiary studies at a South African university.
See: Matriculation in South Africa; High school in South Africa

Public universities in South Africa are divided into three types: traditional universities, which offer theoretically oriented university degrees; universities of technology (formerly called "Technikons"), which offer vocational oriented diplomas and degrees; and comprehensive universities, which offer both types of qualification. Public institutions are usually English medium, although instruction may take place in Afrikaans as well. There are also a large number of other educational institutions in South Africa – some are local campuses of foreign universities, some conduct classes for students who write their exams at the distance-education University of South Africa and some offer unaccredited or non-accredited diplomas.
See: List of universities in South Africa; List of post secondary institutions in South Africa; :Category:Higher education in South Africa

Public expenditure on education was at 6.1% of the 2016 GDP.

Under apartheid, schools for blacks were subject to discrimination through inadequate funding and a separate syllabus called Bantu Education which was only designed to give them sufficient skills to work as labourers. Redressing these imbalances has been a focus of recent education policy; see Education in South Africa: Restructuring.

Scouting
South Africa has also had a large influence in the Scouting movement, with many Scouting traditions and ceremonies coming from the experiences of Robert Baden-Powell (the founder of Scouting) during his time in South Africa as a military officer in the 1890s-1900s. Scouts South Africa (then known as Boy Scouts of South Africa) was one of the first youth organisations to open its doors to youth and adults of all races in South Africa. This happened on 2 July 1977 at a conference known as Quo Vadis.

Society

Gender roles

Sexual orientation

South Africa enacted same-sex marriage laws in 2006 allowing full marriage and adoption rights to same-sex couples. Although the Constitutional and legal system in South Africa theoretically ensures equality, social acceptance is generally lacking, especially outside of urban areas. Lesbian women from smaller towns (especially the townships) are often victims of beating or rape. This has been posited, in part, to be because of the perceived threat they pose to traditional male authority. Although evidence of hatred may influence rulings on a case-by-case basis, South Africa has no specific hate crime legislation; human rights organisations have criticised the South African police for failing to address the matter of bias-motivated crimes.

For example, the NGO ActionAid has condemned the continued impunity and accused governments of turning a blind eye to reported murders of lesbians in homophobic attacks in South Africa; as well as to so-called "corrective" rapes, including cases among pupils, in which cases the male rapists purport to raping the lesbian victim with the intent of thereby "curing" her of her sexual orientation.

Science and technology 

Several important scientific and technological developments have originated in South Africa. The first human-to-human heart transplant was performed by cardiac surgeon Christiaan Barnard at Groote Schuur Hospital in December 1967. Max Theiler developed a vaccine against Yellow Fever, Allan McLeod Cormack pioneered x-ray Computed tomography, and Aaron Klug developed crystallographic electron microscopy techniques. These advancements were all (with the exception of that of Barnard) recognised with Nobel Prizes. Sydney Brenner won most recently, in 2002, for his pioneering work in molecular biology.

Mark Shuttleworth founded an early Internet security company Thawte, that was subsequently bought out by world-leader VeriSign.

South Africa has cultivated a burgeoning astronomy community. It hosts the Southern African Large Telescope, the largest optical telescope in the southern hemisphere. South Africa is currently building the Karoo Array Telescope as a pathfinder for the $20 billion Square Kilometer Array project to be built in South Africa and Australia.

Sports 

The most popular sports in South Africa are association football, rugby, and cricket. Other sports with significant support are field hockey, swimming, athletics, golf, boxing, tennis, netball and softball. Although association football commands the greatest following among the youth, other sports like basketball, surfing, judo and skateboarding are increasingly popular.

Famous boxing personalities include Baby Jake Jacob Matlala, Vuyani Bungu, Welcome Ncita, Dingaan Thobela, Gerrie Coetzee and Brian Mitchell. Footballers who have played for major foreign clubs include Lucas Radebe and Philemon Masinga, (both formerly of Leeds United), Quinton Fortune (Atlético Madrid and Manchester United), Benni McCarthy (Ajax Amsterdam, F.C. Porto, Blackburn Rovers and West Ham United), Aaron Mokoena (Ajax Amsterdam, Blackburn Rovers and Portsmouth), Delron Buckley (Borussia Dortmund) and Steven Pienaar (Ajax Amsterdam and Everton). South Africa has also produced 1979 Formula One World Champion, Jody Scheckter, along with his son, two time Indycar Series race winner, Tomas Scheckter, who led the most laps in both his first two Indianapolis 500 starts during the 2002 and 2003 running of the race. Durban Surfer Jordy Smith won the 2010 Billabong J-Bay competition making him the No.1 ranked surfer in the world. Famous current cricket players include Herschelle Gibbs, Graeme Smith, Jacques Kallis, JP Duminy, etc. Most of them also participate in the Indian Premier League.

South Africa has also produced numerous world class rugby players, including Francois Pienaar, Joost van der Westhuizen, Danie Craven, Frik du Preez, Naas Botha and Bryan Habana. South Africa hosted and won the 1995 Rugby World Cup and won the 2007 Rugby World Cup in France as well as the 2019 Rugby World Cup in Japan. It followed the 1995 Rugby World Cup by hosting the 1996 African Cup of Nations, with the national team going on to win the tournament. It also hosted the 2003 Cricket World Cup, the 2007 World Twenty20 Championship, and it was the host nation for the 2010 FIFA World Cup, which was the first time the tournament was held in Africa. FIFA president Sepp Blatter awarded South Africa a grade 9 out of 10 for successfully hosting the event.

In 2004, the swimming team of Roland Schoeman, Lyndon Ferns, Darian Townsend and Ryk Neethling won the gold medal at the Olympic Games in Athens, simultaneously breaking the world record in the 4x100 freestyle relay. Penny Heyns won Olympic Gold in the 1996 Atlanta Olympic Games.

In golf, Gary Player is generally regarded as one of the greatest golfers of all time, having won the Career Grand Slam, one of five golfers to have done so. Other South African golfers to have won major tournaments include Bobby Locke, Ernie Els, Retief Goosen, Trevor Immelman and Louis Oosthuizen.

See also 
List of South Africans
List of heritage sites in South Africa
Commission for the Promotion and Protection of the Rights of Cultural, Religious and Linguistic Communities
South African art
South Africa
List of South African artists

References